Randolph Neumann (born July 21, 1948), raised in Cliffside Park, New Jersey, is a former professional boxer who has been a referee for the New York State Athletic Commission since 1982.  He has been the "third man" in many championship matches that have taken place in Madison Square Garden in New York City .

Boxer
As a boxer, he compiled a professional record of 31 wins (11 by way of knockout) and 7 losses in 38 contests.  In his career, he faced the likes of Jimmy Young, Chuck Wepner, and Jerry Quarry.  He was ranked as high as the #9 contender for the Heavyweight championship. However, after graduating from Fairleigh Dickinson University in Teaneck, New Jersey with a degree in business in 1975, he decided to retire from boxing.

Though he came back for one more bout as a Cruiserweight against Ibar Arrington on April 15, 1977, he retired from prizefighting for good to focus on acting, writing, and a business career.

Neumann was elected to the board of directors by the members of the International Boxing Federation at their annual convention, held in Montreal in May 2015. While there, he attended his first board meeting at which time he was elected Treasurer of the organization.  Although he no longer referees fights (which he did for 33 years), he now supervises championship fights around the world.

Today he is the President of Randy Neumann Wealth Management located in Upper Saddle River, New Jersey.

Professional boxing record

|-
|align="center" colspan=8|31 Wins (11 knockouts, 20 decisions), 7 Losses (5 knockouts, 2 decisions)
|-
| align="center" style="border-style: none none solid solid; background: #e3e3e3"|Result
| align="center" style="border-style: none none solid solid; background: #e3e3e3"|Record
| align="center" style="border-style: none none solid solid; background: #e3e3e3"|Opponent
| align="center" style="border-style: none none solid solid; background: #e3e3e3"|Type
| align="center" style="border-style: none none solid solid; background: #e3e3e3"|Round
| align="center" style="border-style: none none solid solid; background: #e3e3e3"|Date
| align="center" style="border-style: none none solid solid; background: #e3e3e3"|Location
| align="center" style="border-style: none none solid solid; background: #e3e3e3"|Notes
|-align=center
|Loss
|
|align=left| Ibar Arrington
|TKO
|5
|15/04/1977
|align=left| William L. Dickinson High School, Jersey City, New Jersey
|align=left|
|-
|Loss
|
|align=left| Duane Bobick
|TKO
|4
|12/12/1975
|align=left| Madison Square Garden, New York City, New York
|align=left|
|-
|Win
|
|align=left| Bobby Walker
|UD
|10
|17/10/1975
|align=left| Long Island Arena, Commack, New York
|align=left|
|-
|Win
|
|align=left| Boone Kirkman
|UD
|10
|05/09/1975
|align=left| Las Vegas, Nevada
|align=left|
|-
|Loss
|
|align=left| Wendell Joseph
|DQ
|6
|27/06/1975
|align=left| Nassau, Bahamas
|align=left|
|-
|Win
|
|align=left| Billy Aird
|TKO
|8
|05/06/1975
|align=left| Cunard Hotel, London
|align=left|
|-
|Win
|
|align=left| Larry Renaud
|PTS
|10
|08/04/1975
|align=left| Orlando, Florida
|align=left|
|-
|Win
|
|align=left| "Irish" Bob Scott
|DQ
|2
|21/03/1975
|align=left| Bimini, Bahamas
|align=left|
|-
|Win
|
|align=left| Larry Beilfuss
|TKO
|5
|04/02/1975
|align=left| Milwaukee Auditorium, Milwaukee, Wisconsin
|align=left|
|-
|Win
|
|align=left| Carl "Tank" Baker
|TKO
|10
|15/12/1974
|align=left| Nassau, Bahamas
|align=left|
|-
|Loss
|
|align=left| Chuck Wepner
|TKO
|6
|08/03/1974
|align=left| Madison Square Garden, New York City, New York
|align=left|
|-
|Win
|
|align=left| Reinaldo Raul Gorosito
|PTS
|10
|05/11/1973
|align=left| Felt Forum, New York City, New York
|align=left|
|-
|Win
|
|align=left| Pedro Agosto
|TKO
|9
|10/09/1973
|align=left| Madison Square Garden, New York City, New York
|align=left|
|-
|Win
|
|align=left| Doug Kirk
|TKO
|2
|19/04/1973
|align=left| Embassy Hall, North Bergen, New Jersey
|align=left|
|-
|Loss
|
|align=left| Jerry Quarry
|RTD
|7
|05/01/1973
|align=left| Madison Square Garden, New York City, New York
|align=left|
|-
|Win
|
|align=left| G.G. Maldonado
|TKO
|6
|26/10/1972
|align=left| Embassy Hall, North Bergen, New Jersey
|align=left|
|-
|Win
|
|align=left| Alex Carr
|KO
|1
|14/09/1972
|align=left| Embassy Hall, North Bergen, New Jersey
|align=left|
|-
|Loss
|
|align=left| Chuck Wepner
|PTS
|12
|15/04/1972
|align=left| Jersey City, New Jersey
|align=left|
|-
|Win
|
|align=left| Jimmy Young
|PTS
|10
|10/03/1972
|align=left| Madison Square Garden, New York City, New York
|align=left|
|-
|Win
|
|align=left| Chuck Wepner
|PTS
|12
|09/12/1971
|align=left| Embassy Hall, North Bergen, New Jersey
|align=left|
|-
|Win
|
|align=left| Reinaldo Raul Gorosito
|UD
|10
|17/11/1971
|align=left| Madison Square Garden, New York City, New York
|align=left|
|-
|Win
|
|align=left| Bob Castle
|TKO
|5
|28/10/1971
|align=left| Embassy Hall, North Bergen, New Jersey
|align=left|
|-
|Win
|
|align=left| Brian O'Melia
|PTS
|10
|17/06/1971
|align=left| Embassy Hall, North Bergen, New Jersey
|align=left|
|-
|Win
|
|align=left| Reinaldo Raul Gorosito
|PTS
|8
|13/05/1971
|align=left| Embassy Hall, North Bergen, New Jersey
|align=left|
|-
|Win
|
|align=left| Tony Norris
|PTS
|10
|16/04/1971
|align=left| Paterson Armory, Paterson, New Jersey
|align=left|
|-
|Win
|
|align=left| Jimmy Harris
|PTS
|8
|18/03/1971
|align=left| Embassy Hall, North Bergen, New Jersey
|align=left|
|-
|Loss
|
|align=left| Jimmy Harris
|KO
|2
|18/02/1971
|align=left| Embassy Hall, North Bergen, New Jersey
|align=left|
|-
|Win
|
|align=left| Edmund Stewart
|PTS
|4
|17/06/1970
|align=left| Madison Square Garden, New York City, New York
|align=left|
|-
|Win
|
|align=left| Edmund Stewart
|PTS
|8
|28/05/1970
|align=left| Cliffside Park, New Jersey
|align=left|
|-
|Win
|
|align=left| Sonny Pittman
|PTS
|8
|09/04/1970
|align=left| Embassy Hall, North Bergen, New Jersey
|align=left|
|-
|Win
|
|align=left| Len Couture
|KO
|4
|19/03/1970
|align=left| Embassy Hall, North Bergen, New Jersey
|align=left|
|-
|Win
|
|align=left| Tony Gagliardo
|PTS
|6
|16/02/1970
|align=left| Madison Square Garden, New York City, New York
|align=left|
|-
|Win
|
|align=left| Angel Viera
|TKO
|2
|15/01/1970
|align=left| Embassy Hall, North Bergen, New Jersey
|align=left|
|-
|Win
|
|align=left| Junior Wilkerson
|PTS
|4
|12/12/1969
|align=left| Madison Square Garden, New York City, New York
|align=left|
|-
|Win
|
|align=left| Junior Wilkerson
|PTS
|6
|20/11/1969
|align=left| Embassy Hall, North Bergen, New Jersey
|align=left|
|-
|Win
|
|align=left| George Simpson
|PTS
|6
|30/10/1969
|align=left| Embassy Hall, North Bergen, New Jersey
|align=left|
|-
|Win
|
|align=left| Junior Wilkerson
|PTS
|4
|01/10/1969
|align=left| Jersey City Armory, Jersey City, New Jersey
|align=left|
|-
|Win
|
|align=left| Jeff Marx
|KO
|1
|18/08/1969
|align=left| Madison Square Garden, New York City, New York
|align=left|
|}

Referee
In 1982, he telephoned John Condon (president of Madison Square Garden Boxing) and expressed interest in being a referee. After Condon put in a good word with the New York State Athletic Commission, they started using him as a ringside judge.  Before long, he had his first assignment as a referee in a four-round bout at the Felt Forum (a part of Madison Square Garden).

Neumann is now a widely respected figure within the boxing community and has worked in the ring for 50+ title fights involving champions including Mike Tyson, Wladimir Klitschko, Meldrick Taylor, Buddy McGirt, Chris Byrd, Evander Holyfield, John Ruiz, and many others.

Writer
Neumann wrote an article about a fight that he had against Chuck Wepner in Madison Square Garden that was published in the July 1974 issue of Sport magazine. He wrote 13 columns about boxing for the sports section of the New York Times.  He wrote stories of boxing The New York Post, The New York News Magazine, Forbes, Signature, Harper's, New Jersey Monthly and other magazines.  In 1988 he began writing a financial column for the Hudson Dispatch. Over the years he has syndicated the column in several newspapers.   
He wrote another book titled "Fighting for your Financial Future - Round Two".

References

External links
 
 Referee record

1948 births
Living people
Boxers from New Jersey
American boxing referees
Fairleigh Dickinson University alumni
People from Cliffside Park, New Jersey
Sportspeople from Bergen County, New Jersey
American male boxers
Heavyweight boxers